TCD can be used as:
Chad (ISO 3-letter country code)
Task completion date
Teller cash dispenser
Tentative channel designation
Thalamocortical dysrhythmia
The College Dropout, the debut studio album by Kanye West
Thermal conductivity detector, used in gas chromatography
Thousand cankers disease
Transcranial Doppler, a blood flow test
Transport de Chalands de Débarquement, a type of French Navy ship
Trinity College Dublin
The Chambers Dictionary
T cell depletion